Prorifrons is a genus of moths in the family Lasiocampidae. The genus was erected by William Barnes and James Halliday McDunnough in 1911.

Species
Prorifrons angustipennis Schaus, 1911
Prorifrons antonia Schaus, 1911
Prorifrons castullux Dyar, 1915
Prorifrons championi Druce, 1897
Prorifrons conradti Druce, 1894
Prorifrons costaricensis Draudt, 1927
Prorifrons crenulata Draudt, 1927
Prorifrons crossoea Druce, 1894
Prorifrons doeri Schaus, 1892
Prorifrons granula Schaus, 1924
Prorifrons gustanda Dyar, 1911
Prorifrons hoppi Draudt, 1927
Prorifrons lemoulti Schaus, 1906
Prorifrons lineata Weymer & Maassen, 1890
Prorifrons melana Dognin, 1921
Prorifrons mulleri Draudt, 1927
Prorifrons negrita Dognin, 1921
Prorifrons nox Druce, 1897
Prorifrons peruviana Druce, 1906
Prorifrons phedima Stoll, 1782
Prorifrons prosper Dyar, 1907
Prorifrons rufescens Schaus, 1911
Prorifrons songoensis Draudt, 1927
Prorifrons tamsi Draudt, 1927
Prorifrons tremula Schaus, 1911
Prorifrons vibrans Schaus, 1911

References

Lasiocampidae
Taxa named by William Barnes (entomologist)
Taxa named by James Halliday McDunnough